The Khomanani mine is a large open pit mine located in the north-western part of South Africa in Rustenburg, North West. Khomanani represents one of the largest platinum reserves in South Africa having estimated reserves of 5.3 million oz of platinum. The mine produces around 120,000 oz of platinum/year.

References 

Platinum mines in South Africa
Economy of North West (South African province)
Rustenburg